Capitites is a genus of tephritid  or fruit flies in the family Tephritidae.

Species
Capitites albicans (Munro, 1935)
Capitites aurea (Bezzi, 1924)
Capitites dentiens (Bezzi, 1924)
Capitites dicomala (Munro, 1935)
Capitites goliath (Bezzi, 1924)
Capitites kloofensis (Munro, 1935)
Capitites ramulosa (Loew, 1844)

References

Tephritinae
Tephritidae genera
Diptera of Europe
Diptera of Africa